Father of the Year may refer to:

 American Father of the Year award, award by American Diabetes Association
 Australian Father of the Year award
 "Father of the Year", a 1970 episode of The Brady Bunch
 Father of the Year (film), a 2018 comedy film